Paul Rouster (19 May 1900 – 20 July 1982) was a Luxembourgian footballer. He played in thirteen matches for the Luxembourg national football team between 1923 and 1937.

References

External links

1900 births
1982 deaths
Luxembourgian footballers
Luxembourg international footballers
Place of birth missing
Association football defenders
CA Spora Luxembourg players
Union Luxembourg players